The Dinder River (also spelled Dindar) is a tributary of the Blue Nile.

Course
The Dinder River rises in the Ethiopian Highlands, west of Lake Tana in the Ethiopian woreda of Alefa. It flows northwest out of the highlands and into the plains of the Sudanese state of Sennar. It meanders across the plains to join the Blue Nile near the town of Sennar.

Natural features

The Dinder National Park of Sudan, which stretches south from the Dinder, is named after the river. This watershed was previously habitat to the endangered painted hunting dog, Lycaon pictus; however, this canid is thought to be extirpated in the region due to expansion of the human population and lack of attention to conservation.

See also
List of rivers of Ethiopia
List of rivers of Sudan

References
 C. Michael Hogan. 2009. Painted Hunting Dog: Lycaon pictus, GlobalTwitcher.com, ed. N. Stromberg

Line notes

Rivers of Ethiopia
Rivers of Sudan
Amhara Region
Tributaries of the Blue Nile
International rivers of Africa
Sennar (state)